Achyropsis is a genus of plants in the amaranth family, Amaranthaceae that is found in Africa distributed from Kenya to South Africa.

The genus has six accepted species:

 Achyropsis avicularis (E.Mey. ex Moq.) Cooke & C.H.Wright
 Achyropsis filifolia C.C.Townsend
 Achyropsis fruticulosa C.B.Cl.
 Achyropsis gracilis C.C.Townsend
 Achyropsis laniceps C.B.Cl.
 Achyropsis leptostachya (E.Mev. ex Meisn.) Bak.

References

Flora of Africa
 
Amaranthaceae genera